Wyndham Vale is a suburb of Melbourne in Victoria, Australia.

Wyndham Vale may also refer to:

Wyndham Vale railway station, in Manor Lakes, Victoria, Australia
Wyndhamvale Football Club, based in the suburb